Naraghi may refer to:

People
Akhtar Naraghi, Canadian poet and novelist
Ehsan Naraghi (1926-2012), Iranian sociologist
Mohsen Naraghi (born 1962), Iranian phenomenal nasal surgeon
Hassan Naraghi (1944-2020), Iranian-Canadian author 
Hadi Naraghi, Iranian football player
Laila Naraghi (born 1982), Swedish politician of Persian descent and a member of the Swedish Parliament
Noora Naraghi (born 1988), Iranian motorcross rider
Sanam Naraghi-Anderlini (born 1967), Iranian consultant

Location
Naraghi Lake, a man-made lake in Modesto, California, USA